Episcepsis hypoleuca is a moth of the family Erebidae. It was described by George Hampson in 1898. It is found in Costa Rica.

References

External links

Epidesma hypoleuca at EOL
Episcepsis hypoleuca at BHL

Euchromiina
Moths described in 1898